Irinia is an extinct genus of trilobites in the family Anomocaridae. It lived during the Cambrian Period that lasted from approximately 539 to 485 million years ago.

References

Cambrian trilobites
Anomocaridae